The Messerschmitt P.1079 was a series of different experimental Messerschmitt fighters projected during the Second World War. The last designs were proposed in 1944 towards the end of the Third Reich. 
Except for the last one, all the aircraft designs were to be powered by pulse jets, the same engines used in the V-1 flying bomb.

None of the Messerschmitt P.1079 projects saw mass-production and the pulsejet-powered fighter program was scrapped in December 1944, although Junkers continued developing its model until the last days of the war.

History
The P.1079 Messerschmitt designs span from 1941 to 1944, the latter being the year in which the High Command of the Luftwaffe took to call attention to the need of a strong defense against the devastating allied bombing raids, with its Emergency Fighter Program. 
Since pulsejets were cheaper to build, the possibility of using them to power aircraft was explored, owing to the overstretched industry and materials shortages of the Third Reich at that stage of the war. Thus the main German aircraft manufacturers were asked by the Luftwaffe to produce light fighter designs (Miniaturjäger), using a strict minimum of materials that would be fitted with one Argus As 014 pulsejet engine per unit. 
The projected planes were small, spartan creations, with no landing gear, no radio and almost no electrical equipment, but the mostly propaganda-based aim was to produce them cheaply and in large numbers so as to overwhelm the Allied bomber formations that flew daily over Germany's skies.

All the P.1079 Messerschmitt designs remained on paper, but Junkers built the Ju EF 126 Ellie the only pulsejet-powered fighter project that reached the prototype stage right before the end of the war. For this venture Heinkel would use a He 162 airframe, powered by a pulse jet and Blohm & Voss submitted the Blohm & Voss P 213

At any rate the Argus pulsejets proved themselves unsuitable for manned aircraft that would have to take off unassisted, for they did not produce enough power at low speeds for takeoff. Since additional launch schemes would have to be added to the project, such as towplanes, aircraft catapults or rocket boosters, the goal of the program would be defeated and expenses would be far higher than projected. Thus the pulsejet-powered fighter project never saw mass production, being brought to a close already before 1945.
The last of the Messerschmitt variants, the 1944 Me P.1079 51 project, used a ramjet instead of a pulsejet. But eventually ramjets were also dropped in favor of turbojets towards the end of the Third Reich.

A further variant, the Me P.1079 18 Schwalbe, appears in some publications. But this "experimental aircraft" is a widely publicized hoax, not a real Messerschmitt project.

Variants
All of the Me P.1079 variants were small planes and none of them would have been able to take off unassisted. All projected aircraft were provided with retractable skids for landing.

Me P.1079 1
1941 project powered by a single pulsejet placed above the fuselage. The wings were short and swept back.

Me P.1079 2
1942 interceptor project, powered by a single Argus-Schmidt SR 500 pulsejet. It had the cockpit at the front end of the long fuselage and short swept wings. The narrow air intake was located in a ventral position below the cockpit.

Me P.1079 10c
Powered by a single SR 500 pulsejet, half of which protruded from the tail end. The air intake was located behind the cockpit on top of the fuselage. This was one of the least sophisticated designs.

Me P.1079 13b
Powered by two SR pulsejets placed on both sides of the fuselage. It had twin vertical tailfins.

Me P.1079 15
Asymmetric 1944 design, powered by a single pulsejet, having a broad, flat-looking fuselage with the cockpit on the right side and the pulsejet on the left.

Me P.1079 16
Another asymmetrical small plane powered by a single pulsejet. It was designed in June 1944. Except for the twin vertical tailfins and the air intake design it was similar to the Me P.1079 15 with a broad flat body having the cockpit on the right and the pulsejet on the left.

Me P.1079 51
This was one of the most conventional-looking designs. Since it was powered by a ramjet instead of a pulsejet, it had a wider and shorter fuselage.

See also
V-1 flying bomb
Blohm & Voss P 213
Messerschmitt Me 328
Emergency Fighter Program
List of German aircraft projects, 1939–45

References

External links

P.1079
Abandoned military aircraft projects of Germany
World War II jet aircraft of Germany
Pulsejet-powered aircraft